"Everchanging Times" is a song by American singer Siedah Garrett. It was written by Burt Bacharach, Bill Conti, and Carole Bayer Sager with Bacharach and Bayer producing the song along with David Foster for the 1987 romantic comedy film Baby Boom, directed by Charles Shyer.

Charts

Aretha Franklin version

In 1992, the song was released as "Ever Changing Times" and was re-recorded by American recording artist Aretha Franklin for her thirty-sixth studio album What You See Is What You Sweat (1991) with Michael McDonald having featured vocals. The song served as the fourth single from the album.

Charts

References

1987 songs
1987 singles
1992 singles
Aretha Franklin songs
Songs with music by Burt Bacharach
Songs written by Carole Bayer Sager
Songs written by Bill Conti